Mihályné Károlyi, Née: Countess Katinka Andrássy de Csíkszentkirály és Krasznahorkai (21 September 1892 – 12 June 1985) was a Hungarian noblewoman and the wife of Count Mihály Károlyi, who served as Prime Minister then President of the First Hungarian Republic after the First World War.

They lived abroad since 1919. She was called by political opponents as Red Countess after her husband.

Family
Her father was Count Tivadar Andrássy, a politician and painter, eldest son of Prime Minister of Hungary Gyula Andrássy. She was named after her grandmother, Countess Katinka Kendeffy. She had three sisters: Ilona, Borbála and Klára (or Kája).

She married Count Mihály Károlyi (1875–1955) on 7 November 1914 in Budapest. According to Hungarian tradition, she wore the name of her husband. They had three children: Éva, Ádám and Judit.

Films
The Red Countess, a 1985 Hungarian drama film directed by András Kovács.

Further reading
Károlyi Mihályné: Együtt  a száműzetésben, Európa, 
Károlyi Mihályné: Együtt a forradalomban, Európa,

External links

 Iván Nagy: Magyarország családai czimerekkel és nemzedékrendi táblákkal. I-XIII. Bp., 1857–1868
 
 20 éve hunyt el Andrássy Katinka, a vörös grófnő (2005)
 [ A magyar irodalom története 1945–1975 / Károlyi Mihályné (1898–1986)]
 Grófnő a hídon. Károlyi Mihályné és a baloldaliság

1892 births
1985 deaths
Hungarian nobility
First ladies of Hungary
Hungarian emigrants to Austria
Hungarian emigrants to France
Katinka
Katinka